Carolin is a given name. Notable people with the name include:

Given name
Carolin Babcock (1912–1987), female tennis player from the United States
Carolin Bachmann (born 1988), German politician
Carolin Fortenbacher (born 1963), German Musical actress and singer
Carolin Hingst (born 1980), German pole vaulter
Carolin Leonhardt (born 1984), German sprint canoeist who competed in the 2000s
Carolin Schiewe (born 1988), German football midfielder
Carolin Schnarre (born 1992), German Paralympic equestrian

Surname
Heather Carolin (born 1982), American model and actress
Paddy Carolin (1881–1967), South African rugby union player
Reid Carolin, American film producer, director and screenwriter
Roger Charles Carolin (born 1929), Australian botanist

See also

Carolijn